Erani may refer to:

 Tel Erani, an archaeological site in Israel
 Erani Filiatra, a football club in Greece